Ruan Roelofse (born 18 November 1989) is a professional South African tennis player.

Roelofse has a career high ATP singles ranking of 357 achieved on 27 February 2012 and he has a career high ATP Doubles ranking of 122 achieved on 18 April 2016. He has had more success playing doubles, winning 6 ATP Challenger doubles titles. Roelofse has also won 2 ITF singles titles and 39 ITF doubles titles.

Roelofse has represented South Africa at the Davis Cup where he has a W/L record of 12–7.

Challenger and Futures/World Tennis Tour finals

Singles: 11 (2–9)

Doubles: 82 (45–39)

External links
 
 

1989 births
Living people
Sportspeople from Cape Town
South African male tennis players
White South African people
21st-century South African people